Cuítiva is a town and municipality in the Sugamuxi Province, part of the Colombian department of Boyacá.

Etymology 
The name Cuítiva is derived from Muysccubun and means "Similarity to the chief".

History 
The area of Cuítiva before the Spanish conquest was inhabited by the Muisca, organized in their loose Muisca Confederation. Nearby iraca of Sugamuxi ruled over Cuítiva.

Modern Cuítiva was founded by Juan de San Martín on January 19, 1550.

On the central square a monument honouring messenger god in the religion of the Muisca; Bochica has been erected.

Economy 
Main economical activities of Cuítiva are agriculture; potatoes, peas, wheat, maize and Welsh onions and livestock farming.

Gallery

References 

Municipalities of Boyacá Department
Populated places established in 1550
1550 establishments in the Spanish Empire
Muisca Confederation
Muysccubun